The Incredible Story of the Giant Pear is 2017 Danish animated film directed by Amalie Næsby Fick, Jørgen Lerdam and Philip Einstein Lipski, based on the book of the same name by Jakob Martin Strid. The film was nominated for four Robert Awards, including Best Danish Film, but won Best Children's Film and Best Adapted Screenplay.

Voice cast 
 Alfred Bjerre Larsen as Sebastian
 Liva Elvira Magnussen as Mitcho
 Peter Frödin as Professor Glykose
 Henrik Koefoed as Borgmester JB
 Peter Plaugborg as Viceborgmester Kvist
 Søren Pilmark as Ulysses Karlsen
 Jakob Oftebro as Piratkaptajnen
 Peter Zhelder as Bodegapiraten
 Bjarne Henriksen as Oldefar
 Peter Aude as Oberst Rekyl

Release 
The Incredible Story of the Giant Pear was released theatrically in Denmark on 12 October 2017, and became the fourth most viewed Danish film of 2017 with 216,645 admissions. Elsewhere, it grossed a worldwide total of $3,099,852. Outside of Denmark, the top earning countries were Norway ($1,394,046), South Korea ($680,016) and France ($549,898).

Reception 
The film received generally positive reviews from critics, and in Denmark it received several accolades and nominations.

References

External links 

The Incredible Story of the Giant Pear at the Danish Film Database

2017 films
2017 computer-animated films
2010s children's adventure films
Danish animated films
2010s Danish-language films